Seabed warfare is undersea warfare which takes place on or in relation to the seabed.

Overview
Seabed warfare is defined as “operations to, from and across the ocean floor.”

In general the target of seabed warfare is infrastructure in place on the seabed such as power cables, telecom cables, or natural resource extraction systems. Seabed warfare capabilities are expensive and because of that significant capabilities are only possessed by major powers.

Conflicts on the seabed can be both conventional and unconventional, the latter encompassing non-kinetic approaches such as lawfare.

France has integrated seabed warfare into their military strategy with the concept of Seabed Control Operations which involves expanding their existing mine warfare and hydro-oceanography capabilities to deal with a more comprehensive spectrum of threats.

Platforms
The American Block VI Virginia-class submarines will include the organic ability to employ seabed warfare equipment.

The Russian submarine Losharik is thought to be capable of seabed warfare.

The Chinese HSU-001 is a small UUV, speculated to be optimized for seabed warfare.

See also
 Naval mine
 SOSUS
 Anti-submarine warfare

References

Naval warfare